Microgramma is a sans serif font which was designed by Aldo Novarese and Alessandro Butti for the Nebiolo Type Foundry in 1952. It became popular for use with technical illustrations in the 1960s and was a favourite of graphic designers by the early seventies, its uses ranging from publicity and publication design to packaging, largely because of its availability as a Letraset typeface. Early typesetters (like the AM Varityper) also incorporated it.

Novarese later developed Eurostile in 1962, (a normal and condensed typeface variant) very similar to Microgramma. Eurostile added lower-case letters, a bold condensed variant, and an ultra narrow design he called Eurostile Compact.

Microgramma is almost always used in its extended and bold extended forms (pictured). Initially, it was a titling font with only uppercase letters. Later versions, by Linotype and URW/Nebiolo, contain a lowercase as well, making it functionally identical to Eurostile. These digital versions also include accented Latin characters, mathematical symbols, and Latin ligatures. In the URW/Nebiolo version, there are also extended Latin, subscripts and superscripts, and extended Latin ligatures.

Microgramma OnlyShadow
Microgramma OnlyShadow is a variant of Microgramma Bold that contains only the shadows of Microgramma Extended Bold, designed by URW Studio and Aldo Novarese in 1994. Although Alessandro Butti died in 1959, URW credited him as the designer of the new font.

The Euro sign in the font has a different weight, styled from a different font family, and is not shadowed.

Microgramma in popular culture 

Science fiction films and TV programmes quickly started using the typeface. A number of Gerry Anderson productions in the mid/late-1960s applied the Microgramma font decals to the featured futuristic vehicles.

Alien franchise 

Microgramma and its related variations are used throughout the original Alien franchise films, as well as the more recent reincarnations. Weyland-Yutani, the primary corporate conglomerate within both the earlier and recent Alien films (including the recent genre crossover Alien vs. Predator franchise films), features use of Microgamma and its Bold Extended typeface in its corporate logo, although not exclusively.

Star Trek 
The Microgramma Bold Extended typeface was used extensively in the Star Trek universe, such as Franz Joseph's The Star Trek Star Fleet Technical Manual. The font, in both its original and various altered forms, was incorporated into numerous displays and on ship exteriors in six of the Star Trek motion pictures, as well as depictions of "earlier technology" display screens, particularly for the Enterprise "prequel" series, during the four later television series.A modified version of Microgramma Bold Extended (sometimes called Starfleet Bold Extended) was used for the main hull registry number for Starfleet ships beginning with Star Trek: The Motion Picture in 1979. Some characters were modified, and all characters have red piping outlining them.

WWE 
Following the 2016 WWE Brand Extension Draft and WWE Battleground 2016, WWE Raw unveiled a new logo which used Microgramma font, as did all title cards and graphics. The following night, WWE SmackDown Live also unveiled a new logo - although it did not use Microgramma, all title cards and graphics did.

Movies 

 Cool Hand Luke (1967) (initial credits)
 2001: A Space Odyssey (1968)
 THX 1138 (1971)
 The Andromeda Strain (1971)
 Disney/Pixar's The Incredibles.
 Convoy (1978)
 2010: The Year We Make Contact (1984)
 Back to the Future (1985) (Plutonium Chamber label)
 Aliens (1986) (Acton Power Station)
 Back to the Future Part II (1989) (Mr. Fusion)
 The Truman Show

Television 
The CBS anthology series 'Way Out (1961) was a very early adopter of Microgramma.
The Gerry Anderson TV series programmes Thunderbirds, Captain Scarlet and the Mysterons, Joe 90, Space: 1999, and UFO.
Brazilian television network TV Globo used Microgamma as its corporate font from the mid-60's to 1976, after which it switched to a derivative of ITC Avant Garde.
Nickelodeon's Drake & Josh also used this typeface.
Red Dwarf
NBC News used the typeface in their graphics from 1990 to 1992
SportsCenter logo
24 Oras logo
Balita Pilipinas Ngayon logo
Deal or No Deal logo
Ipaglaban Mo! logo
Judge Mathis logoNews TV Quick Response Team logoOne Western Visayas logoSaksi logo from 2015 to 2019The Wall logo
Used by Network Ten in their logo from 1991 to 2018
Used as the title text for the Eurovision Song Contest 1975 and part of the logo from 2004 to 2014
Used as the logo for HTV's news programme, Report West during the late 70s to early 80s.

 Other 
 Used by Muzak (Airline reels, "Stimulus Progression" sets, More than just music. An Environment album).
 Used by The Human League band, on all pre-Dare releases ("Being Boiled" through to "Boys And Girls"). Was also used on the cover of their compilations The Golden Hour of the Future, The Very Best Of and Original Remixes & Rarities.
 Both the current and previous logos of Toshiba use variants of Microgramma.
 The Casio logo.
 Dell used Microgramma on its products, starting with the OptiPlex GX150 in December 2000, and was used all the way until its 2016 rebrand.
 Many automobile manufacturers in the 1980s and the 1990s, notably Chrysler, General Motors, Honda and Nissan, use Microgramma on the interior gauges and switches of their vehicles. 
 Abarth also use the font extensively.
 The GEICO logo.
 The TRS-80 Color Computer keyboard.
 The VIC-20 keyboard (early models inherited the keyboard style from previous Commodore computers, especially the 3000/4000/8000 series).
 The Ampex Corporation logo.
 The Penn Central (Railroad) wordmark used Microgramma Bold Extended Italic.
 Example from Moscow: Shabolovskaya metro station (opened in 1980) has its name, "ШАБОЛОВСКАЯ" in Cyrillic spelling, engraved in Microgramma-like letters.
 Moog Prodigy front panel inscriptions.
 The Halliburton logo.
 The IMAX logo.
 Used by Japanese post-punk band P-MODEL in their albums Another Game and Scuba.
 Used on Metallica's Master of Puppets album.
 Used on Sleater-Kinney's Dig Me Out album.
 Used by Radiohead in their breakthrough albums, The Bends and OK Computer.
 The logotype for the US rock band Hurt.
 The logotype for the band Pendulum.
 Microgramma is the in-game Doom 3 font.
 Most user interface text in the StarCraft and StarCraft II video games.
 The 1999 video game, Grand Theft Auto 2, uses the Microgramma D font for its logo.
 Homeworld game series.
 The Unicamp logo.
 The call letters in logos for MyNetworkTV affiliates.
 The Tame Impala band logo.
 The Embraer logo
 The KASKUS logo.
 The Occidental Petroleum (OXY) logo.
 The Wicked Weasel logo.
 Used as part of the logos for the games Pokémon HeartGold and SoulSilver''.
 The logotype for Codemasters, as well as used in the Grid series of games.
 The Project Gotham Racing 3 heads-up display uses Microgramma.
 The Halo: Reach heads-up display uses Microgramma.
 The HUD, the heads-up display of Cyberpunk 2077 also uses Microgramma font.
 The logo of Turkish company Sabancı Holding.
 The logo of DMA Design from 2001 to 2002.

According to MasGrafx Racing Graphics, Microgramma is the font of several NASCAR numbers used by Richard Childress Racing and Dale Earnhardt, Inc., such as the #8 (mainly driven by Dale Earnhardt Jr. until 2007), #3 (Dale Earnhardt and Austin Dillon) and #29 (Kevin Harvick). Some of these are in italics. Red Bull Racing also uses the font for their driver numbers in Formula 1.

Microgramma was also the logo font used by Alienware computers until 2016.

References 

Typefaces and fonts introduced in 1952
Letterpress typefaces
Photocomposition typefaces
Digital typefaces
Display typefaces
Typefaces designed by Aldo Novarese
Geometric sans-serif typefaces
Nebiolo typefaces